Colgate is a small village and civil parish in the Horsham district of West Sussex, England, about four miles (6 km) north east of Horsham.

A small village, with its origins at the northern edge of St. Leonards Forest, it has no shops or retail facilities. There is a pub "The Dragon", and a church and a small primary school, which in 2012 received a Good report rating from OFSTED.  There is a range of architectural styles in the village, with houses present from several different design eras.  In the late twentieth century there have been some small developments of new houses in the centre of the village.

Nearby settlements include  villages of a similar size, architectural design, layout, and administrative status in Faygate and Pease Pottage, and the village is located close to the towns of both Horsham and Crawley.

History
The area is associated with the Wealden iron industry, Col possibly referring to charcoal burners. Many hammer ponds are still visible within the parish. Gate is thought  to refer to an entrance to the historically much larger St Leonards Forest.
The centre of the village was dominated by the Red Cedar Farm and Colgate House.  Over the road to the north was Black Hill wood, part of the traditional St Leonards Forest that no longer exists. 

In 1887 the ecclesiastical parish, for which the living benefice was a vicarage of a small Early English style Victorian church was subordinated by the larger civil parish of Horsham and Beeding thanks to the local government reorganization of 1885.   The population at the time was 485.

Twelve sons of Colgate were killed in World War I.  During the Battle of Britain the village was bombed by the Nazis and four people were killed. And a total of seven sons were killed during World War II.  Furthermore, five deaths occurred during the conflict among villagers serving in the Civil Defences that would have included the Home Guard.

Notes

References

External links

Colgate Primary School
Hall-Woodhouse Brewery
Colgate OS Date accessed: 30 December 2015

Horsham District
Villages in West Sussex

Infobox teamplates